Fort class replenishment ship may refer to three classes of replenishment ships:

 Fort-class replenishment oiler (of the mid-1940s)
 Fort Rosalie (Fort I)-class replenishment ship, dating from the 1970s, of the British Royal Navy
 Fort Victoria (Fort II)-class replenishment ship, dating from the 1990s, of the British Royal Navy

See also
 Fort ship (disambiguation)
 Fort (disambiguation)

Ships of the Royal Navy